James F. Amos (born 16 October 1936) is a Bermudian sailor. He competed in the Dragon event at the 1972 Summer Olympics.

References

External links
 

1936 births
Living people
Bermudian male sailors (sport)
Olympic sailors of Bermuda
Sailors at the 1972 Summer Olympics – Dragon
Place of birth missing (living people)